In linear algebra, a matrix unit is a matrix with only one nonzero entry with value 1. For example, the 3 by 3 matrix unit with i = 1 and j = 2 is
A vector unit is a standard unit vector.

A single-entry matrix generalizes the matrix unit for matrices with only one nonzero entry of any value, not necessarily of value 1.

Properties 

The set of m by n matrix units is a basis of the space of m by n matrices.

The product of two matrix units of the same square shape  satisfies the relation

where  is the Kronecker delta.

The group of scalar n-by-n matrices over a ring R is the centralizer of the subset of n-by-n matrix units in the set of n-by-n matrices over R.

The matrix norm (induced by the same two vector norms) of a matrix unit is equal to 1.

When multiplied by another matrix, it isolates a specific row or column in arbitrary position. For example, for any 3-by-3 matrix A:

References

Sparse matrices
1 (number)